The 2013–14 Scottish League Two is the 19th season in the current format of 10 teams in the fourth-tier of Scottish football. This will be the first season of the competition being part of the newly formed Scottish Professional Football League after the merger of the Scottish Premier League and the Scottish Football League.

Stadia and locations

League table

Results

First half of season

Second half of season

References

Scottish League Two seasons
4
4
Scot